Peter de Koning (born 13 October 1960, Vlaardingen) is a Dutch singer. In 1995 he had a big hit with the single, Het is altijd lente in de ogen van de tandarts-assistente (It is always Spring in the eyes of the dentist's assistant). It was written as part of his final exam at Rotterdam Conservatory. It reached No. 5 in the Dutch Singles Chart. He followed that up with the album De avonturen van Peter de Koning

In 2009 he returned as lead vocal and bassist for the Dutch band De Flamingo's.

Discography

Albums
1996: De avonturen van Peter de Koning

Singles

References

External links
Discogs

1960 births
Living people
Dutch male singers
People from Vlaardingen
Codarts University for the Arts alumni